The Beneden Merwede is a stretch of river in the Netherlands, mainly fed by the river Rhine. It starts as the continuation of the Boven Merwede after the branching-off of the Nieuwe Merwede ship canal. It flows from Hardinxveld-Giessendam to Dordrecht, where it splits into the Noord and Oude Maas rivers. Its length is 14.8 km. The river is part of the main shipping route between the port of Rotterdam and the industrial region of the Ruhr, Germany.

There is a road bridge and, more to the east, a railroad bridge between the railway stations Dordrecht Stadspolders and Hardinxveld-Giessendam on the line Dordrecht-Gorinchem.

References

Rivers of the Rhine–Meuse–Scheldt delta
Distributaries of Europe
Rivers of South Holland
Rivers of the Netherlands
Alblasserwaard
Drechtsteden
Hardinxveld-Giessendam
Papendrecht
Sliedrecht